Darling of the Day is a musical with a book by Nunnally Johnson, lyrics by E. Y. Harburg, and music by Jule Styne. It is based on Arnold Bennett's novel Buried Alive and his play The Great Adventure. The show closed after only 31 performances on Broadway in 1968.

Production history
Despite a score still admired by many critics, the show's pre-Broadway run was plagued by difficulties, with three directors and five librettists attempting to resolve perceived problems.

The show marked Vincent Price's first appearance on Broadway since 1954. It was budgeted at $500,000, $150,000 of which came from a record sale to RCA.

The musical finally reached New York City where, following three previews, it opened on January 27, 1968, at the George Abbott Theatre and closed after only 31 performances. Choreography was by Lee Theodore, staging by Noel Willman, scenic design by Oliver Smith, costumes by Raoul Pene Du Bois, and lighting by Peggy Clark.  Johnson, upset with all the changes, demanded his name be removed from the credits. The musical starred Vincent Price (in his first and only Broadway musical) as Priam Farll and Patricia Routledge as Alice Challice. Also featured were Brenda Forbes, Peter Woodthorpe, and Teddy Green. Routledge won the 1968 Tony Award for Best Actress in a Musical.  Reviews were mixed. The show was Price's first singing role since the 1940 film The House of Seven Gables. Price had once been a member of the Yale Glee Club and proved to have an adequate singing voice.  Harburg and Styne considered the piece their best work.

An original cast recording was released by RCA Victor.

Attempts at major revival have made little headway, although there have been several staged concerts and one fully staged revised version.  42nd Street Moon in San Francisco, California, presented the musical as a staged concert in 1994.  The York Theatre Company, in New York, presented the musical in two staged concerts, in 1998 and 2005. Their 2005 concert starred Beth Fowler, Rebecca Luker, Simon Jones and Stephen Mo Hanan.  Light Opera Works, in Evanston, Illinois, presented a fully staged version in 2005 revised by Erik Haagensen based on his earlier work for the York Theatre Company concerts. This was the first complete staged production since the musical closed on Broadway.

In 2010, the London Discovering Lost Musicals series presented the show in concert at the Oondatje Wing Theatre – National Portrait Gallery, starring Nicholas Jones as Priam and Louise Gold as Alice. The show received its first full production in England at the Union Theatre in March 2013, with James Dinsmore as Priam, Katy Secombe as Alice and Rebecca Caine as Lady Vale.

Synopsis
In 1905 London, Priam Farll is an artist, brilliant, unconventional and shy, although he can be violently outspoken. He once offended Queen Victoria and was exiled to the South Pacific (shades of Gauguin), but Edward VII has succeeded to the throne, and Farll has been recalled to London to receive a knighthood.

Appalled by "society's" expectations of its "darling of the day" (a common Victorian/Edwardian term meaning something like "fashionable celebrity") Farll seizes the chance to "get out of the world alive" when his faithful butler Henry Leek suddenly dies, and their identities are confused by an official.  Instead of correcting the error, Farll quietly assumes the identity of the deceased, and Leek's corpse is officially buried in Westminster Abbey as the famous artist.

He soon finds himself married to Alice Challice, a bright, well-to-do widow who had been corresponding with the real Henry Leek – and settles down to a happy "upper working class" existence. Farll continues to paint, and when his wife runs into financial difficulties he sells a few paintings. Complications naturally ensue, and his "cover" becomes increasingly flimsy. Just as it looks as if he will be compelled to resume his real identity, a piece of truly Gilbertian nonsense brings all to a satisfactory conclusion, and he is allowed to stay plain Henry Leek after all.

Song list

Act I
  Mad For Art
  He's A Genius
  To Get Out Of This World Alive
  It's Enough To Make A Lady Fall In Love
  A Gentleman's Gentleman
  Double Soliloquy
  Let's See What Happens
  Panache
  I've Got A Rainbow Working For Me
  Money, Money, Money
  That Something Extra Special

Act II
  What Makes a Marriage Merry
  He's A Genius (Reprise)
  Not On Your Nellie
  Sunset Tree
  Butler In The Abbey
  Not On Your Nellie (Reprise)

Response
The play was profiled in the William Goldman book The Season: A Candid Look at Broadway.

The New York Times review called the musical bland and stale, but praised Routledge, who "...really can sing." "The high point of 'Darling of the Day' is a thumping good production number in the local pub ("Not on Your Nellie") in which Miss Routledge, somewhat sozzled, kicks up her heels with a bunch of the boys." Price plays with "friendly blandness...he sings, too, and not badly."  The score is as slight as it is consonant."

Walter Kerr wrote that "the score is one of the very best Jule Styne has ever composed for the theater", that Harburg's "lyrics are much more fun than the cloddish rhyming we're accustomed to" and the book "is full of pleasant surprises." He praised Routledge:"the most spectacular, most scrumptious, most embraceable musical comedy debut since Beatrice Lillie and Gertrude Lawrence came to this country as a package."

According to theatre writer and historian John Kenrick, many critics felt that Vincent Price was "woefully miscast". There was, however, unanimous praise for Routledge. The book is criticized as having a "hopelessly silly plot and an endlessly chatty libretto ..." but "the score is a lost musical gem that is well worth hearing".

Kenrick wrote that "One can only hope that this all too brief run [at the York] will inspire someone in the New York area to give this show the fully staged revival it richly deserves."

Ethan Mordden wrote that Vincent Price was blamed by some for the failure of the show; however, "he played the role quite well and even held his own in eight numbers." The score was blamed by others: "... it hasn't one potential hit ... It's halfway back to operetta, and this was not a time that admired the style." Finally, wrote Mordden, "It needed a strong director. It needed a director, period."

Cast and crew of 2010 revival
Complete cast list includes
Alice Chalice – Louise Gold,
Priam Farll – Nicholas Jones,
Clive Oxford – Michael Roberts,
Henry Leek/ Pennington – Paul Stewart,
Lady Vale – Vivienne Martin,
Cabby/ Constable/ Mrs Leek – Myra Sands,
Doctor/ Bert – Lee William-Davis,
Daphne – Nicola Bryan,
Alf – Adam Dutton,
Rosey – Cristin Curtin,
Sydney/ Judge – Michael Storrs,
Duncan Farll – Chris Stanton,
Attendant – Emma Hatton

Mark Warman – Musical Director & piano

Ian Marshall Fisher – Director

Notes

References
Not Since Carrie: Forty Years of Broadway Musical Flops by Ken Mandelbaum

External links
 
 Information about the cast album and the show
 Description of Styne shows, with a profile of Darling
  (archive)

1968 musicals
Broadway musicals
Musicals based on novels
Musicals based on plays
Musicals by Jule Styne
Plays by Nunnally Johnson
Tony Award-winning musicals